Dewolf Point State Park is a  state park on Wellesley Island in the St. Lawrence River. The park is situated within the Town of Orleans in Jefferson County, New York. The park was established in 1898 as part of the St. Lawrence Reservation.

Park description
Facilities offered by the park include a gazebo, a boat launch and docks, cabins, fishing, picnic tables, and a campground with tent and trailer sites. The park has views overlooking Lake of the Isles.

The park is easily accessible to visitors, being close to Interstate 81, which links northwards to  Highway 401 in Ontario, Canada. The park is the first recreational area which visitors from Canada come to, when crossing into the United States over the Thousand Islands Bridge.

The park is open from late April to mid-September.

See also
 List of New York state parks

References

External links
 New York State Parks: Dewolf Point State Park

State parks of New York (state)
Thousand Islands
Parks in Jefferson County, New York